Christopher Granger Atkeson (born 1959) is an American roboticist and a professor at the Robotics Institute and Human-Computer Interaction Institute at Carnegie Mellon University (CMU). Atkeson is known for his work in humanoid robots, soft robotics, and machine learning, most notably on locally weighted learning.

Early life and education
Atkeson graduated summa cum laude from Harvard University in 1981 with an A.B. in biochemistry. He received his S.M. degree in applied mathematics in the same year, also from Harvard. He then attended the Massachusetts Institute of Technology and received his PhD in brain and cognitive science from them in 1986, advised by Emilio Bizzi.

Career
Before joining the faculty at CMU in 2000, he was an assistant, then associate professor in the department of Brain and Cognitive Sciences at MIT from 1986 to 1993. He was also an associate professor at the College of Computing, Georgia Institute of Technology from 1994 to 2000.

Atkeson's work in soft robotics helped influence production on the 2014 Disney film Big Hero 6, and he consulted with the film's production team on the design of Baymax.

Honors and awards
 National Science Foundation Engineering Initiation Award, 1987–1988.
 National Science Foundation Presidential Young Investigator Award, 1988–1993.
 W. M. Keck Foundation Assistant Professorship in Biomedical Engineering, 1988–1990.
 Alfred P. Sloan Research Fellow, 1989–1991.
 W. M. Keck Foundation Associate Professorship in Biomedical Engineering, 1990–1991.
 Teaching Award from the MIT Graduate Student Council, 1990.
 Edenfield Faculty Fellowship Award, 1995.
 Elected by faculty to College of Computing Dean's Advisory Committee, 1995–1996, 1996–1997.
 Finalist, Best Paper Award, ICRA 2000.

Personal life
Atkeson is married to Jessica Hodgins, Professor of Computer Science and Robotics at CMU, and former director of Disney Research, Pittsburgh.

References

External links
 Home Page
 Mathematics Genealogy Project profile

Artificial intelligence researchers
Georgia Tech faculty
Carnegie Mellon University faculty
Living people
Machine learning researchers
American roboticists
1959 births
Massachusetts Institute of Technology School of Science alumni
Sloan Research Fellows
Disney Research people
Harvard School of Engineering and Applied Sciences alumni